The Netherlands competed at the 2012 European Track Championships in Panevėžys, the Lithuania, from 19 October to October 2012. The Netherlands competed in 4 of the 13 different disciplines.

Results

Sprint

Team sprint

Keirin

Omnium

Source

See also

  Netherlands at the 2012 UCI Road World Championships

References

2012 in Dutch sport
Netherlands at cycling events
2012 European Track Championships
Nations at the European Track Championships
Nations at sport events in 2012